Sérgio Francisco Oulu (born 19 May 1993) is a Portuguese footballer  who plays for Real S.C., as a defender.

Football career
On 8 September 2017, Oulu made his professional debut with Real in a 2017–18 LigaPro match against Benfica B.

References

External links

Portuguese League profile 

1993 births
Living people
Portuguese footballers
Association football defenders
Liga Portugal 2 players
Real S.C. players